Michael Treanor (born April 17, 1979) is a former actor and martial artist who starred in 3 Ninjas and 3 Ninjas Knuckle Up. He is the third son of Richard and Peggy Treanor.

Treanor was discovered by casting agents for 3 Ninjas in his martial arts class. After encouragement from friends and family, he auditioned for and successfully landed the role of eldest brother Rocky.

Biography
Michael Treanor was born in Los Angeles, California on April 17, 1979. He is the youngest child of Richard Treanor and Peggy. He has a sister Erin and two brothers, Adam and Brian.

Michael has had a passion for martial arts since he was a child and trained in both Tae Kwon Do and karate. At the age of twelve he achieved a black belt. By the age of thirteen he achieved second degree black belt and it was around this time he was brought to the attention of the casting director for the first film in the 3 Ninjas quartet. By the age of sixteen Michael had advanced to a third degree black belt.

In 1992, Treanor was awarded the part of Samuel "Rocky" Douglas Jr. after he was advised to audition for the film by the casting director.

Treanor originally appeared in the first installment of the 3 Ninjas series playing the eldest brother of the three. His role was played by another actor in the third film, but he returned for the second film (3 Ninjas Knuckle Up), along with other original cast members such as Chad Power who portrayed Michael "Tum Tum" Douglas in both films.

Treanor has not appeared in any films since 3 Ninjas Knuckle Up, and left the acting profession by choice.

Filmography

References

External links

1979 births
Living people
American male child actors